The 2012 Open Diputación Ciudad de Pozoblanco was a professional tennis tournament played on outdoor hard courts. It was part of the Tretorn SERIE+ of the 2012 ATP Challenger Tour. It takes place in Pozoblanco, Spain between August 6 and 12, 2012.

Singles main-draw entrants

Seeds

 1 Rankings are as of June 20, 2012.

Other entrants
The following players received wildcards into the singles main draw:
  Roberto Carballes Baena
  Frederico Gil
  Illya Marchenko
  Tommy Robredo

The following players received entry from the qualifying draw:
  Olivier Charroin
  Riccardo Ghedin
  Carles Poch Gradin
  Matthieu Roy

Champions

Singles

  Roberto Bautista Agut def.  Arnau Brugués Davi, 6–3, 6–4

Doubles

  Konstantin Kravchuk /  Denys Molchanov def.  Adrian Mannarino /  Maxime Teixeira, 6–3, 6–3

References
Official Website

 
Open Diputación Ciudad de Pozoblanco
Poza
Pozoblanco